Department of Railways may refer to:
New Zealand Railways Department
Department of Railways New South Wales
Department of Railways (1858–71), Victoria, Australia
Nepal Department of Railways
 Railways Department (Hong Kong)